The Ramsey County Poor Farm Barn served as home and work for the indigent in Ramsey County, Minnesota, United States. The barn is now used by the Ramsey County Cooperative extension service. It is listed on the National Register of Historic Places.

The second floor housed the Ramsey County Fright Farm, a popular haunted attraction, from 1996 through 2020.

References

External links

Fright Farm Haunted House

Barns on the National Register of Historic Places in Minnesota
Buildings and structures in Ramsey County, Minnesota
Infrastructure completed in 1918
Poor farms
Barns in Minnesota
National Register of Historic Places in Ramsey County, Minnesota
Barns with hay hoods